Bully Buhlan (3 February 1924 – 7 November 1982) was a German musician and actor.

Filmography

References

Bibliography
 Barnett, David. A History of the Berliner Ensemble. Cambridge University Press, 2015.

External links

1924 births
1982 deaths
20th-century German male singers
German male film actors
Male actors from Berlin
Singers from Berlin
20th-century German male actors
People from Steglitz-Zehlendorf